Kelchsauer Ache is a river of Tyrol, Austria.

It discharges into the Brixentaler Ache at 
Hopfgarten im Brixental.

References

Rivers of Tyrol (state)
Rivers of Austria